"Crawling" is a song by American rock band Linkin Park. It is the second single from their debut album, Hybrid Theory, and is the fifth track on the album. It was released on March 1, 2001, as their second single and won a Grammy for Best Hard Rock Performance in 2002. In January 2011, "Crawling" was released in a Linkin Park DLC pack for Rock Band 3.

Background
"Crawling" is one of the few songs on Hybrid Theory that do not prominently feature Mike Shinoda's rap sung lyrics. The intro to "Crawling" has been remixed in live versions over the years. Since 2008's Projekt Revolution, Mike Shinoda has rapped the first verse of "Hands Held High" over the intro to Reanimation version of "Crawling", titled "Krwlng" (featuring Staind frontman Aaron Lewis). In 2009, Shinoda rapped two verses of "Hands Held High" over the intro of "Crawling", which first verse started with an a cappella or a bassline before the Reanimation intro started, in which Shinoda raps the second verse. Singer Chester Bennington remarked that "Crawling" was the most difficult Linkin Park song to sing live, stating "Crawling has caused me the most trouble live more than any other song."  Bennington also commented on the meaning of "Crawling" by stating it was inspired by his own battles with substance abuse. "Crawling is about feeling like I had no control over myself in terms of drugs and alcohol, hence the line "These wounds they will not heal...". The song is recorded in the key of C# minor.

A live version of "Crawling" was included as a B-side to "Breaking the Habit".

Music video

The video was directed by the Brothers Strause. It portrays a young woman's inner conflict dealing with an abusive relationship. The woman (portrayed by Katelyn Rosaasen) closes off to the rest of the world, represented with the special effects of crystals forming around her. By the end, the crystals recede.

This video was supposed to have a "darker" ending to it when the first synopsis was written, being a take on Species where a psycho fan kills the band, but Warner Bros. rejected the idea, and the final ending was written in its place.

"Crawling" was the first music video with Dave Farrell in the band. Phoenix returned to Linkin Park just before they began work on this video.

As of December 2022, the music video for "Crawling" has over 370 million views on YouTube.

The video was nominated for Best Rock video on MTV's Video Music Awards. It lost to Limp Bizkit's "Rollin".

Bonus content
The bonus feature on the CD is the same footage that is a hidden easter egg on Frat Party at the Pankake Festival. However, the footage here is uncensored, while the footage on "Frat Party" is censored.

A "Strictly Limited Numbered Edition" DVD single was also released which includes a live version of "Crawling" that was performed at the Dragon Festival, though the audio is dubbed with the studio version of the song. The video has a multiple camera angle feature which allows viewers to see different camera angles of the performance with the use of the DVD remote control.  The DVD also has four 30-second live snippets of "One Step Closer", "By Myself", "With You", and "A Place for My Head".  The live video of "Crawling" is available on Warner Bros. Records YouTube channel, which was uploaded on February 9, 2010. The video is also available as a DVD extra to "Frat Party at the Pankake Festival".

Cover versions
Coldplay frontman Chris Martin performed a solo piano rendition of "Crawling" live in early August 2017. The performance was a tribute to Chester Bennington, who died on July 20, 2017, from suicide.

The song was performed by the band along with Bring Me the Horizon vocalist Oliver Sykes filling in for Chester's vocals and DJ and record producer Zedd on drums during the Linkin Park and Friends: Celebrate Life in Honor of Chester Bennington show at the Hollywood Bowl on October 27, 2017.

Staind frontman Aaron Lewis performed a tribute version of "Crawling" live on stage on August 10, 2017, at Look Park in Florence, Massachusetts.

Jared Leto of 30 Seconds to Mars included Crawling in a mashup tribute to Bennington.

American rock band New Years Day performed a cover version on their 2018 EP Diary of a Creep.

A cover version by Dream State is featured on the 2018 compilation album Songs That Saved My Life.

American heavy metal band Bad Wolves performed a cover version on their Patreon account in May 2020.

American singer-songwriter Terry Blade performed a cover version on his 2021 debut album American Descendant of Slavery, the Album which was later featured in a visual media rendition created and directed by Jay Carney that won "Best Music Video" at V.i.Z. Film Fest 2021.

In other media
At the Vancouver 2010 Winter Olympics, John and Sinead Kerr representing Great Britain performed the Reanimation version of "Krwling" in the figure skating ice dance final.

Commercial performance 
The song has seen a success in many countries. In the United Kingdom, the song debuted and peaked at number 16 and stayed on the chart for eight weeks. It reached the top ten in Canada and Austria. It reached the top thirty and top forty in many countries, it was more successful than "One Step Closer". However, it peaked only at number 79 in the United States, becoming their lowest charting single until they released "Given Up", which peaked at number 99, although it managed to peak at number five on the Modern Rock Track Chart and number three on the Mainstream Rock Track Chart. Despite the low peak, the song remained for 20 weeks at the bottom of the chart, which is longer than the 18 weeks spent by "One Step Closer".

Track listing

Charts

Weekly charts

Year-end charts

Certifications

Release history

Personnel
Credits adapted from AllMusic for original release only.

Linkin Park
 Chester Bennington – vocals
 Mike Shinoda – rap vocals, keyboards, programming, samples, rhythm guitar, artwork and production
 Brad Delson – guitars, bass guitar
 Joe Hahn – turntables, samples, synthesizers, artwork
 Rob Bourdon – drums, percussion

Production
 Don Gilmore – producer, engineering
 Steve Sisco – Engineering
 John Ewing Jr. – Additional engineering, Pro Tools
 Matt Griffin – Engineering assistance
 Andy Wallace – mixing
 Brian Gardner – Audio mastering, digital editing
 Jeff Blue – executive producer

Artwork
Frank Maddocks – graphic design
James Minchin III – photography

References

External links
 "Crawling" official music video

2000 songs
2001 singles
Linkin Park songs
Songs based on actual events
Songs about drugs
Songs about alcohol
Songs written by Mike Shinoda
Warner Records singles
Grammy Award for Best Hard Rock Performance